Andrew William Walker is an English footballer who plays for Southern Counties East Football League Premier Division side Phoenix Sports.

Career
Walker played professionally for both Colchester United and Exeter City and has also had a stint at Doncaster Rovers. Walker has also played for St Albans City, Tonbridge Angels, Wingate & Finchley and Bromley before joining Maidstone United in the summer of 2008. He spent a year at Maidstone, winning the Supporters Player of the Year in the process, before joining Billericay due to budget cuts at the Stones. He rejoined Maidstone on a month loan in February 2010 before the deal was made permanent in March 2010, and again won the Supporters Player of the Year for the 2010–11 season. In June 2011, Walker left Maidstone to join Cray Wanderers, with the player citing Maidstone's relegation to the Isthmian League Division One South as his reason for leaving the club.

Walker made over 100 appearances for Cray in all competitions, before leaving the club in September 2013, following a managerial change. He moved on to Thurrock and then Harlow Town, before joining Thamesmead Town at the beginning of the 2015–16 season. Walker won promotion with Chatham Town in the 2021–22 season before joining Phoenix Sports.

References

Living people
1981 births
Colchester United F.C. players
St Albans City F.C. players
Exeter City F.C. players
Tonbridge Angels F.C. players
Doncaster Rovers F.C. players
Wingate & Finchley F.C. players
Bromley F.C. players
Maidstone United F.C. players
Billericay Town F.C. players
Cray Wanderers F.C. players
Thurrock F.C. players
Harlow Town F.C. players
Thamesmead Town F.C. players
Cray Valley Paper Mills F.C. players
Erith Town F.C. players
Chatham Town F.C. players
Phoenix Sports F.C. players
English Football League players
Isthmian League players
Association football goalkeepers
English footballers